Hortebrekka Slope is a crevassed ice slope which marks the eastern edge of Horteriset Dome, just west of the Weyprecht Mountains in Queen Maud Land, Antarctica. It was photographed from the air by the Third German Antarctic Expedition (1938–39), and was mapped and named by Norwegian cartographers from surveys and air photos by the Sixth Norwegian Antarctic Expedition (1956–60).

References

Ice slopes of Queen Maud Land
Princess Astrid Coast